Minotaur IV, also known as Peacekeeper SLV and OSP-2 PK is an active expendable launch system derived from the LGM-118 Peacekeeper ICBM. It is operated by Northrop Grumman Innovation Systems, and made its maiden flight on 22 April 2010, carrying the HTV-2a Hypersonic Test Vehicle. The first orbital launch occurred on 26 September 2010 with the SBSS satellite for the United States Air Force.

The Minotaur IV vehicle consists of four stages and is capable of placing  of payload into a Low Earth orbit (LEO). It uses the first three stages of the Peacekeeper missile, combined with a new upper stage. On the baseline version, the fourth stage is an Orion 38. However a higher performance variant, designated Minotaur IV+, uses a Star-48V instead. A three-stage configuration (no Orion 38), designated the Minotaur IV Lite, is available for suborbital trajectories. The Minotaur IV has also been flown with multiple upper stages. A five-stage derivative, the Minotaur V, made its maiden flight on 7 September 2013.

Minotaur IV launches are conducted from SLC-8 at Vandenberg Air Force Base, LP-0B at the Mid-Atlantic Regional Spaceport, SLC-46 at Cape Canaveral Air Force Station and Pacific Spaceport Complex – Alaska Pad 1 of the Pacific Spaceport Complex – Alaska (PSCA).

Launch history

Planned launches

STP-S26 
The third Minotaur IV launch, which was also known as STP-S26, deployed eight payloads. It was the 29th small launch vehicle mission in STP's 49-year history of flying DoD space experiments, STP-S26 was intended to extend previous standard interface development efforts, implementing a number of capabilities aimed at enabling responsive access to space for small experimental satellites and payloads. STP-S96 launched at 01:25 UTC on 20 November 2019 from the Kodiak Launch Complex. The launch facility contractor was Alaska Aerospace Corporation (AAC). The payloads were released in a  orbit, before the HAPS upper stage was demonstrated by deploying two ballast payloads into a  orbit.

The primary objective of the STP-S26 launch was to deploy STPSAT-2 (USA-287), whilst demonstrating the ability of the Minotaur IV to carry additional payloads, by deploying FASTSAT, FASTRAC, RAX, O/OREOS and FalconSat-5. A Hydrazine Auxiliary Propulsion System upper stage was flown aboard the Minotaur to demonstrate its ability to deploy payloads to multiple orbits, however only mass simulators were deployed after the HAPS burn.

The launch marked the first flight of an STP-SIV (Standard Interface Vehicle) satellite, the first use of the Multi Mission Satellite Operations Center Ground System Architecture (MMSOC GSA), the first flight of the Minotaur IV's Multi-payload Adapter (MPA), the first use of a HAPS to obtain multiple orbits on a Minotaur IV flight, the first Minotaur launch from Kodiak Launch Complex (KLC), and the first deployment of CubeSats from a Minotaur IV via Poly-PicoSatellite Orbital Deployers (P-Pods).

See also 

 Comparison of orbital launchers families
 Comparison of orbital launch systems

References

External links 
 FASTRAC Ready To Go Into Space
 Alaskan Aerospace Corp official website

2009 in spaceflight
Minotaur (rocket family)